Doubleday Field is a baseball stadium in Cooperstown, New York named for Abner Doubleday and located two village blocks from the National Baseball Hall of Fame and Museum.

The grounds have been used for baseball since 1920, on what was Elihu Phinney's farm. A wooden grandstand was built in 1924, later replaced by a steel and concrete grandstand built in 1939 by the Works Project Administration. Subsequent expansion has increased seating capacity to 9,791 spectators.

Hall of Fame Game

Each year from 1940 to 2008, Doubleday Field hosted the Hall of Fame Game, an exhibition game between two major league squads. Originally, the game and induction ceremony for new Hall of Fame members were held on the same day, a Monday. Starting in 1979, the induction ceremony was moved to Sunday, with the game played on Monday. Starting in 2003, the game was scheduled in May or June, to better accommodate the participating teams' travel schedules.

As MLB's last remaining in-season exhibition game, its results did not count in the official standings, and substitute players were generally used to avoid injury to starters. The curiosity factor of two teams from different leagues playing each other in this game outside of a charity game, World Series, or spring training situation was eventually removed in 1997 with the launch of interleague play, further reducing the game's cachet. As it was placed in the major league schedule and delaying the game was logistically impossible, several times the game was cancelled and not played in a year due to weather or other circumstances, including rain, the 1981 player's strike, and one, year, a plane malfunction. Games going into extra innings stopped with the 1988 edition, with only nine innings played and ties being declared.

On January 29, 2008, Major League Baseball announced that the final Hall of Fame Game would be played on June 16, 2008, between the Chicago Cubs and San Diego Padres, citing "the inherent challenges" of scheduling teams in the modern day as the reason for ending the annual contest. The 2008 game was rained out and never rescheduled, making the 2007 matchup between the Baltimore Orioles and Toronto Blue Jays the last Hall of Fame Game that was played.

Results

Notes:
 A New York–Penn League game between the Elmira Pioneers and Oneonta Yankees was played in 1981.
 The Boston Red Sox played an intra-squad game in 1989.
@ Denotes games played between teams in the same league.
With the participation of the Tampa Bay Devil Rays in 2003, every MLB franchise had participated in a Hall of Fame game.

Hall of Fame Classic
In November 2008, the Hall of Fame and the MLB Players Alumni Association announced the creation of the Hall of Fame Classic, an exhibition game involving Hall of Famers and other retired MLB players to be played on Father's Day weekend, and in recent years on the Saturday before Memorial Day. The inaugural Hall of Fame Classic was played on Sunday, June 21, 2009. The Hall of Fame game lasts seven innings or two hours, whichever comes first. In addition to the game, there is a parade and a home run derby beforehand. The game has been played annually since 2011. In March 2020 it was announced by the Hall of Fame that that year's game would be canceled "in accordance with recommendations by the Centers for Disease Control and government officials to limit opportunities for large gatherings and the further spread of the COVID-19 virus." The 2021 game was cancelled as well. In 2022, the Hall announced the game would resume.

Cooperstown Classic
The Cooperstown Classic was an International League regular season game played in honor of the 125th anniversary of the league in 2008. The game was held on a Sunday afternoon in May between the Rochester Red Wings and the Syracuse Chiefs. The game was the third of a four-game series in which the Chiefs were the home team. The crowd for the game was very respectable and Major League Hall of Fame member Carlton Fisk threw out the first pitch. The game was postponed after the second inning after a rain delay in which Syracuse lead 1-0 and went on to win the following day in its completion at Alliance Bank Stadium. In an attempt to give the fans another game, the Cooperstown Classic Two was played on a Sunday in June 2009. This game was played between the Pawtucket Red Sox and the home team Syracuse Chiefs. The game was played in full with the Red Sox winning 15-3. This game was not played after that but many have expressed interest in it after the demise of the MLB Hall Of Fame Game in 2008.

Other uses
Doubleday Field is used primarily for amateur and American Legion ball; The Legends of Baseball rents out Doubleday for three weeks over the summer. The Cooperstown Hawkeyes of the Perfect Game Collegiate Baseball League use the field during the summer, while Play at the Plate Baseball also has an annual event at Doubleday Field every September.

No professional team has ever called the stadium home, although in 1996 the Northeast League considered placing a franchise in Cooperstown; this idea was rejected because Doubleday Field has no lights, a necessity for a team in a pro league. Also, some felt that Cooperstown should be the home of all baseball, and not just one team. However, the New York–Penn League has played an annual regular-season game at Doubleday Field since 1991, with the team based in nearby Oneonta serving as the home team through 2009. (The team was known as the Oneonta Yankees until 1999, when they switched affiliations to become the Oneonta Tigers in 1999. The franchise moved to Connecticut in 2010, but has continued to host the Cooperstown game.)

References

External links

http://www.playattheplate.org
Legends of Baseball
Doubleday Field, A Diamond in the Pasture, explains how Elihu Phinney's farm became the famous ball park.
Ball Parks of the Minor Leagues: Doubleday Field
Rochester Area Ballparks: Doubleday Field
Project Ballpark: Doubleday Field
Baseball Hall of Fame: Rain washes away final Hall of Fame Game

National Baseball Hall of Fame and Museum
Minor league baseball venues
Sports venues in Otsego County, New York
Baseball venues in New York (state)
Works Progress Administration in New York (state)
1920 establishments in New York (state)
Sports venues completed in 1920